Madhu Malini was Indian film actress.

Filmography

 Noor Mahal (1965)
 Dharti Kahe Pukarke (1969)
 Phir Aya Toofan (1973)
 Shubdin (1974)
 Phanda (1975)
 Pratiggya (1975) - Ajit's sister
 Zid (1976)
 Dream Girl (1977)
 Dil Aur Deewaar (1978) - Blackmailer's associate
 Muqaddar Ka Sikandar (1978) - Mihru
 Bhagyalaxmi (1978)
 Ranjha Ikk Tey Heeran Do (1979) - Rani
 Nauker (1979) - Shobha
 Dada (1979) - Bobby (Bihari's daughter)
 Bharat Ki Santan (1980)
 Yeh Kaisa Insaf? (1980) - Sharda Nath
 Trilok Sundari (1980)
 Thaliritta Kinakkal (1980)
 Teen Ekkey (1980) - Sona - maharani of Sonapur
 Laawaris (1981) - Madhu Singh
 Ek Duuje Ke Liye (1981) - Devi
 Meena Kumari Ki Amar Kahani (1981)
 Kanoon Aur Mujrim (1981)
 Aamne Samne (1982) - Rekha
 Tadap (1982)
 Khud-Daar (1982) - Farida
 Sun Sajna (1982) - Champa (Gopi's girlfriend)
 Johny I Love You (1982) - Shop-keeper
 Bezubaan (1982) - Vija - Kalpana's girlfriend
 Dil Hi Dil Mein (1982) - Geeta Anand
 Chambal Ke Daku (1982)
 Taqdeer (1983) - Alka Rai
 Avtaar (1983) - Zubeida A. Ahmed
 Sun Meri Laila (1983) - Salma
 Ambri (1983) - Ambri
 Razia Sultan (1983)
 Sweekar Kiya Maine (1983) - Parminder Kaur 'Pammi' A. Chhadha
 Kalakar (1983) - Sheela
 Ek Din Bahu Ka (1983) - Madhu (uncredited)
 Boxer (1984) - Rajni's girlfriend (uncredited)
 Zakhmi Sher (1984)
 Shapath (1984) - Shanoo (Vijay's sister)
 All Rounder (1984) - Kalyani
 Aakhri Sangram (1984)
 Pyar Jhukta Nahin (1985) - Mala Mathur
 Hum Dono (1985) - Sapna
 Salma (1985)
 Maujaan Dubai Diyan (1985) - Madhu
 Kaanch Ki Deewar (1986) - Mary
 Zindagani (1986) - Dancer in restaurant
 Uddhar (1986)
 Inteqam Ki Aag (1986) - Maya
 108 Teerthyatra (1987) - Ingla
 Woh Mili Thi (1988) - Shamli
 Bhed Bhav (1988) - (final film role)

Malayalam
 Thaliritta Kinakkal (1980)
 Chora Chuvanna Chora (1980) - Gouri
 Arayannam (1981) - Nalini

Tamil
 Thaayillamal Naan Illai (1979) - Jaya
 Uthiripookkal (1979) - Shenbagam

Telugu
Prema Kanuka (1980)-Gowri
Thodu Dongalu (1981)

References

External links
 

Year of birth missing (living people)
Living people
Place of birth missing (living people)
Indian film actresses
Actresses in Hindi cinema